Gadchiroli Assembly constituency is one of the 288 Vidhan Sabha (legislative assembly) constituencies of Maharashtra state, western India. This constituency is located in Gadchiroli district. The delimitation of the constituency happened in 2008.

Geographical scope
The constituency comprises Gadchiroli taluka, Chamorshi taluka, parts of Dhanora Tehsil viz. revenue circles Dhanora and Chatgaon.

Representatives

References

Assembly constituencies of Maharashtra